Brian Fernandez is an American politician who is State Senator for the Arizona 23rd Legislative District and former member of the Arizona House of Representatives from the 4th legislative district beginning in 2021. He was appointed to the seat after incumbent Representative Charlene Fernandez, his mother, resigned the seat to become Director of Rural Development for the United States Department of Agriculture. He is a member of the Democratic Party.

Fernandez is a native of Yuma, and went to Arizona State University. Prior to joining the legislature, he volunteered for several political campaigns, including those of former Governor Janet Napolitano, and Congressmen Ruben Gallego and Ed Pastor. Brian also founded a software startup, Team Start, which does business in Arizona and Mexico City.

Early life and education
Fernandez was born in Yuma, Arizona to Sergio and Charlene Fernandez. He attended Yuma High School where he graduated, and went on to attend Arizona State University  earning a Bachelor's degree.

Career
Fernandez worked for the Congressional Black Caucus under Chairwoman Carolyn Cheeks Kilpatrick as Technology Director. Upon leaving, Fernandez co-founded Symfodium, building a CRM software for members of congress. After exiting, Fernandez founded Team Start in Arizona, building software for different entities including the University of Arizona College of Medicine, Phoenix.

In November 2021, Fernandez's mother resigned to become Director of Rural Development for the United States Department of Agriculture. Within eight days Fernandez was appointed and sworn in to replace her.

Political career

Arizona House of Representatives
Fernandez was appointed to the unfinished term of his mother, Arizona House Democratic Leader Charlene Fernandez after her resignation to run USDA Rural Development in Arizona under President Joe Biden.

Fernandez was appointed to the Committee on Transportation and the Committee on Land, Agriculture and Rural Affairs.

Senate
Fernandez ran for the seat left open by the retirement of Senator Lisa Otondo. He was uncontested in the primary and won the general election by over 7 points against the Republican candidate Gary Snyder. Many prominent Republicans supported him, including his seat mate Representative Joel John.

Fernandez was appointed to the Committee on Appropriations, Committee on Environment, Natural Resources and Water and the Joint Legislative Budget Committee.

Arizona Legislative Career

Committee on Transportation
Fernandez was instrumental in passing and later funding in a last minute budget deal the expansion and modernization of Cesar Chavez Blvd in San Luis, Arizona for 34 million dollars. The road which connects the Interstate 8 with Highway 95 is heavily used by local residents, business, and international trade as it connects both border checkpoints in Yuma County. Much of the opposition was centered on the cost of the road.

Fernandez has worked with other legislators around the state to spend over a billion dollars on critical infrastructure needs funded primarily by the bipartisan infrastructure deal enacted by President Joe Biden.

Education
Fernandez brought 5 million dollars in a last minute budget deal to the Yuma campus of Northern Arizona University. The money is being used to bring more bachelor degree and job training programs to Yuma County being requested by Yuma business leaders. Fernandez continues to work with all three universities to bring additional education programing to the southwestern Arizona.

Fernandez was instrumental in the bipartisan education deal which brought another 1 billion dollars to public education.

Water
Fernandez brought together farmers and ranchers throughout the state to bring a billion dollar spending bill on water infrastructure. The money will be used for water augmentation and conservation.

Electoral history

References

External links
 Official page at the Arizona State Legislature
 Biography at Ballotpedia

21st-century American politicians
Living people
People from Yuma, Arizona
Democratic Party members of the Arizona House of Representatives
Arizona State University alumni
Year of birth missing (living people)
Hispanic and Latino American state legislators in Arizona